The English-Speaking Union Schools' Mace is an annual debating tournament for secondary schools in England, Ireland, Scotland and Wales.

The competition was founded in 1957 by the journalist Kenneth Harris of The Observer newspaper, and was initially known as The Observer Schools' Mace. Since 1995, the tournament has been organised by the English-Speaking Union, with assistance from several regional convenors.

Schools across the United Kingdom and Ireland are eligible to enter one team in the championships each year, made up of two student debaters from the school. Teams compete in area qualifying rounds, with the best performing teams going on to the national finals to determine an English, Irish, Scottish and Welsh champion team. These four teams then compete in an International Final to determine the overall champions. The championship trophy is known as the Silver Mace.

The equivalent competition for universities in the UK and Ireland is the John Smith Memorial Mace.

Past champions

See also 

 John Smith Memorial Mace (universities competition)
 English-Speaking Union

References

External links 
 Page on the ESU Schools Mace at the English-Speaking Union website
 Page on the ESU Schools Mace at britishdebate.com

European debating competitions
Schools debating competitions